The Kapisa Women's Center was opened in Mahmud Raqi, Kapisa Province, Afghanistan, in December 2007.
It cost $450,000.

Gallery

References

Women's organisations based in Afghanistan